Mohammadabad Airstrip is an airstrip situated at Mohammadabad in Farrukhabad district in the Indian state of Uttar Pradesh. It is owned by Uttar Pradesh Government.

See also
 Chaudhary Charan Singh Airport
 Lal Bahadur Shastri Airport
 Noida International Airport
 Kanpur Airport
 Allahabad Airport
 Bareilly Airport

References

Airports in Uttar Pradesh
Farrukhabad district
Airports with year of establishment missing